Seibersdorf is an Austrian market town with 1,283 residents in the District of Baden in Lower Austria.

Geography
Seibersdorf lies in the industrial belt of Lower Austria. The municipality has an area of 20.2 km², 9.36 percent of which is forested.

Seibersdorf contains the following districts: Deutsch-Brodersdorf, Seibersdorf.

History
In antiquity, the area was part of the Roman province of Pannonia.  Located in the Austrian heartland, Lower Austria played a key part in much of Austrian history.

Population

Infrastructure
Seibersdorf is best known as the site of Austrian Research Centers, now called the Austrian Institute of Technology (AIT). The International Atomic Energy Agency also operates laboratories within the same premises.

See also 
 Leithaprodersdorf

References

 The information in this article is based on or translated from its German equivalent.

Cities and towns in Baden District, Austria